F.C. De Kampioenen is a Belgian comic strip created by Hec Leemans since 1997 and published by Standaard Uitgeverij. The comics series is based on the television sitcom comedy series of the same name on Flemish television. The series ran for 94 albums with numerous special versions and editions.

Setting 
The comics follows the television show rather closely and replicates the atmosphere and the settings faithfully. Primarily, the comics exhibits a humorous and fun atmosphere. Premiering in 1997, the comics proved to be a great success propelling itself to be one of the top 5 best-selling comic strips in Flanders, together with The Adventures of Urbanus, Jommeke, Spike and Suzy, and De Kiekeboes. The comics ran from 1997 to 2011 with 94 albums published.

Narrative 
The comic strip only follows the big story lines of the television series like new characters and the Marc Vertongen and Bieke Crucke wedding. Despite this, the albums run separately from the story line of the television show.

The first antagonist Dimitri De Tremmerie is a main character in albums 1 to 6. He will later reappear for guest performances.

Bernard Theofiel Waterslaeghers is the important antagonist in Album 7 to 16. Unlike the television series, he does not go away but re-appear for  guest performances.

Eventually, Fernand Costermans becomes the from album 17 to the very end.

In December 2013, a comic book was published with the first championship film. Album 79 gives the story of the movie a different turn.

Guest Appearances
Characters have appeared in several comics.
De Kiekeboes - Main character
Triootje Kampioenen → Three already published albums together.
De Boma-Special! → Three previously released stories with Boma in the lead and additional games.
De Marcske-Special! → Three already published stories with Marcske in the lead.
De Xavier en Carmen-Special → Three already published stories with Xavier and / or Carmen in the lead.
Op zoek naar Neroke → Story of Carmen, Nero and Xavier (+ cd)
10 jaar kampioenenstrips → Stickers, pictures, games, Fingerpopies of the Champions, and a story with the football matches from the comic strip (Title: The Struggle).
F.C. De Kampioenen Pretboek → Funbook with games, puzzles, magic tricks, recipes.
Championettes-special → Three already published albums with the women in the lead.

Albums

Main Series 
These are the main compilations/albums. The ones marked with the word CD are available in audio format. 
 Zal 't gaan, ja?
 Mijn gedacht!
 
 Vliegende dagschotels
 't Is niet waar, hé?
 De dubbele dino's
 Kampioen zijn is plezant!
 Kampioenen op verplaatsing
 Tournee Zenerale
 De ontsnapping van Sinterklaas
 Xavier in de puree
 Het sehks-schandaal
 De kampioenen maken een film
 Oma Boma
 De huilende hooligan
 Bij Sjoeke en Sjoeke
 Het geval Pascale
 De simpele duif
 Supermarkske
 Supermarkske slaat terug
 Kampioenen aan zee
 Boma in de coma
 De dader heeft het gedaan
 De wereldkampioenen
 Sergeant Carmen
 Het spiedende oog
 Vertongen en zoon
 Man, man, man!
 Stem voor mij!
 Gebakken lucht
 Kampioenen op wielen
 De zeep-serie
 Kampioenen in Afrika
 Supermarkske op de bres
 Agent Vertongen
 De trouwpartij
 Kampioenen op latten
 Buffalo Boma
 De vliegende reporter
 De groene zwaan
 Xavier gaat vreemd
 De lastige kampioentjes
 Boma in de wellness
 De antieke antiquair
 Alle hens aan dek
 Supermarkske op het slechte pad
 De schat van de Macboma's
 De Jobhopper
 De Kampioenen in het circus
 50 Kaarsjes (CD)
 Baby Vertongen
 De nies van de neus
 Don Padre Padrone
 De rally van tante Eulalie
 Paulientje op de dool (CD)
 Miss Moeial
 Carmen in het nieuw
 Het geheim van de kampioentjes
 De Afronaut
 De erfenis van Maurice (CD)
 De Kampioenen maken ambras
 Oma Boma trainer
 DDT doet weer mee
 20 jaar later
 De Kampioenen in Pampanero (CD) 
 Kampioentjes verliefd
 Supermarkske is weer fit
 De pil van Pol
 Vertongen Vampier
 Fernand gaat Trouwen (CD)
 De verdwenen Kampioenen
 Xaverius De Grote
 Komen vreten
 Dolle Door
 Hello 
 De vinnige voetballer
 Vijftig tinten paarsblauw
 [Dokter Jekyll en mister Vertongen
 De Kampioenen van De filmset
 De Kampioentjes en het spookkasteel
 De Kampioenen in Rio
 Boma op de klippen
 Op zoek naar Neroke
 Supermarkske bakt ze bruin
 De Corsicaanse connectie
 De Lottokampioen
 DDT Op Het Witte Doek
 De Geniale Djinn
 Paniek in de Pussycat
 De Kampioentjes Maken het Bont
 De Malle Mascotte
 De Pakjesoorlog (CD)
 Supermarkske Is Weer Proper
 De Tandartsassistente

Special Versions 
Some special albums have also been released:
Het geheim van de kousenband
Triootje Kampioenen
De Boma-Special!
De Markske-Special!
De Xavier en Carmen-Special
10 Jaar Kampioenenstrips
F.C. De Kampioenen Pretboek
De Fernand-special
F.C. De Kampioenen Vriendenboek
De Championettes special
F.C. De Kampioenen Omnibus
F.C. De Kampioenen Knotsgek Puzzelboek
F.C. De Kampioenen op reis special
Op zoek naar Markske
Detective-Special
De superspecial
Boma presenteert: De tweede omnibus
Op zoek naar Carmen
De plezantste special
De Bibberspecial
De TV-special
Carmen presenteert: De derde omnibus
De Paulientje-special
Fernand presenteert: De vierde omnibus
15 jaar Kampioenenstrips!
Paulientje presenteert: De vijfde omnibus
De Kampioentjes-special
F.C. De Kampioenen: De Filmspecial
F.C. De Kampioenen: De Wereldkampioenen Special
Knotsgek moppenboek
Het complete foute spelletjesboek van Mark Vertonien
Bieke presenteert: De zesde omnibus
F.C. De Kampioenen: Special Op glad ijs
Knotsgek zoekboek
365 x pret
EK special

Special Editions 
Zal 't gaan ja - 29 April 1999
De ontsnapping van Sinterklaas -  6 December 1999
Supermarkske - 9 June 2004
Supermarkske - 9 June 2004
Zal 't gaan ja  - 13 November 2004
De zeep-serie - 25 January 2005
De dader heeft het gedaan - Gazet van Antwerpen 55 - 6 April 2005
De dader heeft het gedaan - 6 April 2005
De ontsnapping van Sinterklaas - 30 November 2005
Xavier in de puree - 10 January 2007
De huilende hooligan - 17 January 2007
Kampioenen aan zee - 24 January 2007
Sergeant Carmen - 31 January 2007
Het spiedende oog - 7 February 2007
Man, man, man ! - 14 February 2007
Gebakken Lucht - 21 February 2007
Kampioenen in Afrika - 28 February 2007
Agent Vertongen - 7 maart 2007
Buffalo Boma - 14 maart 2007
Kampioenen op wielen - 13 July 2010
Kampioenen aan zee - 20 July 2010
Kampioenen in Afrika - 27 July 2010
Baby Vertongen - 28 September 2010
Carmen in het nieuw - 5 October 2010
De nies van de neus - 12 October 2010
De erfenis van Maurice - 19 October 2010
Supermarkske op de bres - 31 October 2011
Man, man man! - 8 November 2011
Stem voor mij! - 15 November 2011
Sergeant Carmen - 22 November 2011
Zal 't gaan, ja? - 7 July 2012
Supermarkske slaat terug - 14 July 2012
Boma in de coma - 21 July 2012
Xavier gaat vreemd  - 28 July 2012
Kampioenen in Afrika  - 4 August 2012
De trouwpartij - 11 August 2012
De vliegende reporter - 18 August 2012
De Kampioenen in het circus  - 25 August 2012
De Afronaut - 1 September 2012
Vertongen vampier  - 8 September 2012

References

Belgian comic strips
Belgian comics titles
1997 comics debuts
Comics based on television series
Association football comics
Humor comics
Adventure comics
Comics set in Belgium
Works set in Flanders